Zlatka (Златка) is a South Slavic female given name.  It  is derived from the South Slavic word zlato - from the Old Slavic root zolto (gold). The word Златка also literally means marten in Bulgarian. Notable people with the name include:

Zlatka Gaberova, Bulgarian footballer
Zlatka Georgieva, Bulgarian sprinter

See also

Slavic names